Ignavigranum is a Gram-positive, facultatively anaerobic non-spore-forming and non-motile genus of bacteria from the family of Aerococcaceae with one known species (Ignavigranum ruoffiae).

References

Lactobacillales
Bacteria genera
Monotypic bacteria genera